Saltcoats is a town in east-central Saskatchewan near the Manitoba border in Canada. The town's population was 474 in 2011. The town was built in the late 19th century, and its economy was driven by the railway. There is no longer passenger service to the town.

History
The community was established in 1887, just before the arrival of the Manitoba and Northwestern Railway in 1888; a post office was opened when rail service began. In 1894, Saltcoats was the first village incorporated in the North-West Territories as they then were.  The town was originally named 'Stirling', but when the railway arrived the name was changed to Saltcoats, after Saltcoats, Scotland, the birthplace of a major railway shareholder and the home port of Allen Steam-ship Lines which brought over many of the immigrants from the British Isles that settled in the region.

In 1902, 208 Welsh settlers (44 families) fleeing unfavourable conditions in Welsh Patagonia came to Saltcoats, but within a generation their community lost its cultural cohesion and melted into the English-speaking cultural matrix.

Demographics 

Government
Provincial representation
 Melville - Saltcoats Riding - Bob Bjornerud - Saskatchewan Party

Federal representation
 Yorkton Riding - Gary Breitkreuz - Conservative Party of Canada

Media 
The Four-Town Journal covers Saltcoats and area.

Notable people 

The Honourable Gordon Barnhart: Lieutenant-Governor of Saskatchewan (2007–2012)
The Very Reverend Walter H. Farquharson: internationally noted hymnodist; former moderator of the United Church of Canada
Ron Liepert, broadcaster, member of the Legislative Assembly of Alberta, Alberta cabinet minister, Member of Parliament
Joan McCusker: gold medallist in curling (1998 Winter Olympics)

References

Towns in Saskatchewan
Populated places established in 1887
Saltcoats No. 213, Saskatchewan
Division No. 5, Saskatchewan